The 1937–38 AHL season was the second season of the International-American Hockey League, known in the present day as the American Hockey League.  It was the second season in which the International Hockey League and Canadian-American Hockey League played an interlocking schedule as a "circuit of mutual convenience" with an interlocking schedule. Teams played a 48 game season, with the IHL serving as the West Division and the C-AHL serving as the East Division. The Cleveland Barons won the F. G. "Teddy" Oke Trophy as the Western Division champions,  while the Providence Reds won the Calder Cup as league champions.

After the season, the IHL and C-AHL formerly merged into a unified league under the I-AHL name.

Team changes
The Cleveland Falcons are renamed the Cleveland Barons.

Final standings
Note: GP = Games played; W = Wins; L = Losses; T = Ties; GF = Goals for; GA = Goals against; Pts = Points;

Scoring leaders

Note: GP = Games played; G = Goals; A = Assists; Pts = Points; PIM = Penalty minutes

Calder Cup playoffs

See also
List of AHL seasons

References
AHL official site
AHL Hall of Fame
HockeyDB
hockeyleaguehistory.com

American Hockey League seasons
2